Stanislav Romanov (born 14 May 1987) is a Russian professional ice hockey defenceman who is currently playing with Dizel Penza in the Supreme Hockey League (VHL). He previously played three seasons for HC Vityaz of the Kontinental Hockey League (KHL).

On May 19, 2014, Romanov was traded by Neftekhimik Nizhnekamsk in exchange for draft picks to Lada Togliatti for the 2014–15 season.

References

External links

1987 births
Living people
Dizel Penza players
HC Lada Togliatti players
Lokomotiv Yaroslavl players
Metallurg Novokuznetsk players
HC Neftekhimik Nizhnekamsk players
Russian ice hockey defencemen
Sportspeople from Saratov
HC Vityaz players
HC Yugra players